Actinodaphne bourdillonii is a species of the genus Actinodaphne of the  flowering plant family Lauraceae, commonly called the malavirinji, eeyoli, and pisa.  Its general habitat is shola and evergreen forests. It is endemic to the Southern Western Ghats (South Sahyadri and Palakkad Hills).

Description 
Actinodaphne bourdillonii is a tree up to 10 m tall.  Branches and young branchlets are terete, fulvous tomentose. Leaves are simple, alternate, spiral, and subverticilate. Fruits are a black berry; a single seed is seen inside the fruit. Flowering and fruiting season is from April to March.

Seed contains 48.4% fat. 96% of this fat is trilaurin. It also contains louric acid.

Gallery

References

External links 

bourdillonii